The Komancza Republic, also known as the Eastern Lemko Republic, Vyslik Republic, and Lemko Republic, was a short-lived microstate, an association of thirty three Lemko villages, seated in Komańcza in the east of the Lemko Region, that existed between 4 November 1918 and 24 January 1919. It was headed by Head of the Council (голова Повітової Української Національної Ради, Head of the Ukrainian National County Council) Rev. Panteleymon Shpylka.

Unlike the contemporaneous Lemko Republic to its west (which sought unification with the Russian Soviet Republic), the Komancza Republic planned to unite with the West Ukrainian People's Republic in an independent Ukrainian state. However, this was suppressed by the Polish government as part of the Polish–Ukrainian War.

The Treaty of Saint-Germain made Galicia west of the San Polish.

List of villages constituting the Republic 

 Baligród
 Cisna
 Czystogarb
 Przybyszów
 Darów
 Karlików
 Płonna
 Jawornik
 Komańcza
 Kulaszne
 Kalnica
 Rzepedź
 Turzańsk
 Duszatyn
 Prełuki
 Maniów
 Morochów
 Moszczaniec
 Balnica
 Smolnik
 Wola Michowa
 Łupków
 Osławica
 Radoszyce
 Dołżyca
 Mików
 Surowica
 Sukowate
 Szczawne
 Wysoczany
 Mokre
 Puławy
 Wisłok Wielki

Citations

Notelist

References

External links 
 Short history with flag

Lemko Region
History of Carpathian Ruthenia
States succeeding Austria-Hungary
Former republics
1918 establishments in Poland
History of Podkarpackie Voivodeship
History of Galicia (Eastern Europe)
States and territories established in 1918
States and territories disestablished in 1919
1918-11-04